Someshvara II who was administering the area around Gadag succeeded his father Someshvara I (Ahavamalla) as the Western Chalukya king. He was the eldest son of Someshvara I. During his reign Someshvara II was constantly under threat from his more ambitious younger brother Vikramaditya VI. Eventually Someshvara was deposed by Vikramaditya VI.

Around 1070 AD Someshvara II expanded his empire and brought Malava under his control.

Chola invasion
Almost immediately after coming to power, Someshvara II had to face an invasion by the Chola forces led by Virarajendra Chola. The Chola army invaded the Chalukya country and laid a siege to the town of Gutti in (Kurnool district) and attacked Kampili. Instead of assisting his brother in order to save the Chalukya kingdom, Vikramaditya turned the troubles of his brother into his opportunity to capture the Chalukya throne.

Vikramaditya's Opportunism
Vikramaditya saw the opportunity presented by the confusion in the kingdom due to the Chola invasion. Vikramaditya seduced Someshvara's feudatories from their loyalty towards the monarch, and with their aid, entered into negotiations with the Chola king Virarajendra.

Vikramaditya made his alliance with Virarajendra.

Chalukya civil war
The political situation drastically changed when Virarajendra died in 1070 and his son Athirajendra Chola came to the Chola throne. Kulothunga Chola I eventually came to the Chola throne in a confusion created by civil disturbances in which Athirajendra was assassinated. As Vikramaditya was antagonistic towards Kulothunga, Someshvara II went into an alliance with Kulothunga and prepared to attack Vikramaditya.

The conflict eventually occurred in 1075 when Kulothunga launched an attack on Vikramaditya. Someshvara aided Kulothunga Chola by attacking Vikramaditya's rear. What resulted was a brief civil war in which Someshvara suffered heavy defeats and his fate is unknown after the defeat.. Vikramaditya captured the Chalukya king and imprisoned him. Vikramaditya VI proclaimed himself the Chalukuya king in 1076.

See also
 Virarajendra Chola
 Kulothunga Chola I

References 

 Nilakanta Sastri, K.A. (1955). A History of South India, OUP, New Delhi (Reprinted 2002).
 Nilakanta Sastri, K.A. (1935). The CōĻas, University of Madras, Madras (Reprinted 1984). 
 Dr. Suryanath U. Kamat (2001). Concise History of Karnataka, MCC, Bangalore (Reprinted 2002).

Year of birth missing
Western Chalukya Empire
11th-century monarchs in Asia